Simchat Torah or Simhat Torah (lit., "Rejoicing with/of the Torah", Ashkenazi: Simchas Torah) is a Jewish holiday that celebrates and marks the conclusion of the annual cycle of public Torah readings, and the beginning of a new cycle. Simchat Torah is a component of the Biblical Jewish holiday of Shemini Atzeret ("Eighth Day of Assembly"), which follows immediately after the festival of Sukkot in the month of Tishrei (occurring in mid-September to early October on the Gregorian calendar).

The main celebrations of Simchat Torah take place in the synagogue during evening and morning services. In many Orthodox as well as many Conservative congregations, this is the only time of year on which the Torah scrolls are taken out of the ark and read at night. In the morning, the last parashah of Deuteronomy and the first parashah of Genesis are read in the synagogue. On each occasion, when the ark is opened, the worshippers leave their seats to dance and sing with the Torah scrolls in a joyous celebration that can last for several hours.

The morning service is also uniquely characterized by the calling up of each member of the congregation for an aliyah. There is also a special aliyah for all the children.

Duration of holiday

On the Hebrew calendar, the seven-day holiday of Sukkot in the autumn (late mid-September to late mid-October) is immediately followed by the holiday of Shemini Atzeret. In Orthodox and Conservative communities outside Israel, Shemini Atzeret is a two-day holiday and the Simchat Torah festivities are observed on the second day. The first day is referred to as "Shemini Atzeret" and the second day as "Simchat Torah", although both days are officially Shemini Atzeret according to Halakha, and this is reflected in the liturgy. Many Hasidic communities have Hakafot on the eve of the first day of Shemini Atzeret as well.

In Israel, Shemini Atzeret and Simchat Torah are celebrated on the same day. Reform congregations, even outside Israel, may do likewise. Many communities in Israel have Hakafot Shniyot ("Second Hakafot") on the evening following the holiday, which is the same day as Simchat Torah evening in the diaspora. The custom was started by the former Chief Rabbi of Tel Aviv, Rabbi Yedidya Frankel.

Evening festivities
The Simchat Torah festivities begin with the evening service. All the synagogue's Torah scrolls are removed from the ark and are carried around the sanctuary in a series of seven hakafot (circuits). Although each hakafa need only encompass one circuit around the synagogue, the dancing and singing with the Torah often continues much longer, and may overflow from the synagogue onto the streets.

In Orthodox and Conservative Jewish synagogues, each circuit is announced by a few melodious invocations imploring God to Hoshiah Na ("Save us") and ending with the refrain, Aneinu B'yom Koreinu ("[God] answer us on the day we call"). In Orthodox and Conservative synagogues, the hakafot are accompanied by traditional chants, including biblical and liturgical verses and songs about the Torah, the goodness of God, Messianic yearnings, and prayers for the restoration of the House of David and of the Temple in Jerusalem. Congregations may also sing other, popular songs during the dancing. Children often receive flags, candies and other treats. The vigour of the dancing and degree of festive merriment varies with congregational temperament.

In Orthodox synagogues, men and boys predominate in the dancing; children (even young girls) may also dance with their fathers. Women and older girls often have their own dancing circles (sometimes with the Torah scrolls), or look on from the other side of a mechitza (partition), in accordance with the value of tzniut (modesty).
In Conservative and Progressive congregations, men and women dance together. In some congregations, the Torah scrolls are carried out into the streets and the dancing may continue far into the evening.

After the hakafot, many congregations recite a portion of the last parashah of the Torah, V'Zot HaBerachah ("This is the Blessing ...") in Deuteronomy. The part read is usually 33:1–34:12, but this may vary by individual synagogue custom, although Deuteronomy is never read to the end in the evening.

Morning festivities

The morning service, like that of other Jewish holidays, includes a special holiday Amidah, the saying of Hallel, and a holiday Mussaf service. When the ark is opened to take out the Torah for the Torah reading, all the scrolls are again removed from the ark and the congregation again starts the seven hakafot just like in the evening.

Early priestly blessing

In most Eastern Ashkenazic communities, one deviation from an otherwise ordinary holiday morning service is the performance of the Priestly Blessing as part of the Shacharit service, before the celebrations connected with the Torah reading begin, rather than as part of the Musaf service that follows. This practice hearkens back to an old custom for the kiddush sponsored by the Hatan Torah (see below) to be held during the Simchat Torah service itself where hard liquor (along with other refreshments) may be served. Since the Bible prohibits Kohanim (descendants of Aaron) from performing the priestly blessing while intoxicated, and there is concern that Kohanim may imbibe alcoholic beverages during the Simchat Torah festivities, the blessing was moved to before the time when alcohol would be served. In some congregations, the Kohanim deliver their blessing as usual during the Musaf service of Simchat Torah. In some Western Ashkenazic communities, as well as in many communities in Israel, the Kohanim deliver their blessing at both Shacharit and Musaf services, as is done on every Festival.

Torah reading and customs

After the hakafot and the dancing, three scrolls of the Torah are read. The last parashah of the Torah, V'Zot HaBerachah, at the end of Deuteronomy (33:1–34:12), is read from the first scroll, followed immediately by the first chapter (and part of the second) of the Book of Genesis (1:1–2:3), which is read from the second scroll. It is a Jewish custom that a new beginning must immediately follow a completion, therefore it is logical to immediately read Gen. 1 after finishing Deuteronomy.

It is a special honor to receive the last aliyah of the Book of Deuteronomy; the person receiving that aliyah is called the Hatan Torah (the groom of the Torah) (or Kallat Torah (the bride of the Torah) in synagogues that allow women to receive an aliyah). Likewise, it is a special honor to receive the first aliyah of the Book of Genesis; that person is called Hatan B'reishit (the groom of Genesis) (or Kallat B'reishit (the bride of Genesis).

In many congregations it is customary to call all eligible members of the congregation for an aliyah to the Torah on Simchat Torah. To accommodate this the first five aliyot are reread so that everyone has an opportunity to recite the blessing. To save time, some congregations call people up in groups. Others hold a series of separate minyanim for the Torah reading. In a minority of Orthodox congregations women receive aliyot in single-gender tefillah groups (prayer groups consisting only of women, who pray together), and only men are called to the Torah in front of the whole congregation.

Another custom is to call all the children (in Orthodox congregations boys only) to a special aliyah called Kol HaNe'arim ("all the children"). In many congregations, a large talit is spread out over the heads of all the children as the blessing over the Torah is pronounced, and for the congregation to bless the children by reciting (in Hebrew) a verse from Jacob's blessing to Ephraim and Manasseh, Genesis 48:16.

May the angel who redeems me from all evil bless the children, and may my name be declared among them, and the names of my fathers Abraham and Isaac, and may they teem like fish for multitude within the land.

Although the blessing of the children is omitted from the 1985 edition of Conservative Judaism's Siddur Sim Shalom prayer book, it was reinstated in later versions. Most Conservative congregations still perform it.

After the portion of Genesis is read, the Maftir, Numbers 29:35–30:1, is read from a third Torah scroll. The passage describes the prescribed offerings performed for the holiday. The haftarah (reading from the prophets) is the first section of the Book of Joshua.

History

The name Simhat Torah was not used until a relatively late time. In the Talmud (Meg. 31b) it is called Shemini Atzeret.

Celebration and Dancing 
Modern customs of celebration and dancing arose in the early Rishonic period. Isaac ibn Ghiyyat (1030–1089) writes in his Me'ah She'arim that he asked Hayy ben Sherira "about those whose wont is to remove the sefer torah from its ark at the close of the holiday, and [Hayy] responded that this is not our practice . . . but that local customs should not change." Joseph Colon Trabotto adds in his Responsa that in his edition (ours is lacunose) Ghiyyat added that Hayy had also written "Our habit is to dance [on the day after Sh'mini Atzeret] specifically, even many of the elders, when they make eulogies of the torah, and this is permitted because it glorifies the torah", a ruling affirmed by Moses Isserles (Darkhei Moshe). This places the custom of removing the scrolls from the ark and dancing in some locales into the 11th century. Abraham ben Isaac of Narbonne (1080 – 1158) writes in haEshkol that ". . . this teaches that we make a feast to complete the torah, therefore we make great feasts and ample delicacies on the day of Simchat Torah, to honor the torah's completion". Zedekiah ben Abraham Anaw (13th century) writes in Shibbolei haLeqet  that "It is called Simchat Torah . . . the custom is for the Chatan Torah to make a feast and to distribute sweets and candies".

Readings 
In the 9th century, some European Jewish communities assigned a special reading from the Prophets to be read on this day. In the 13th century, the reading of Genesis was added immediately upon the completion of Deuteronomy and the Shulhan Arukh (written about 1565) only mentions this without mentioning the presumably later custom of southern European countries to remove all the Torah scrolls from the ark and to sing a separate hymn for each one. In northern European countries, those who had finished the reading of Deuteronomy made donations to the synagogue, after which the wealthier members of the community would give a dinner for friends and acquaintances. By the end of the 15th century, it was a common though not universal practice for the children to tear down and burn the sukkahs on Simhat Torah.

In the 16th century, the practice of taking out the scrolls and filing solemnly around the bimah on the night of the 23rd of Tishri became customary; and on the same evening, after the procession, a number of passages from the Torah were read.

In the 17th century, Rebecca bat Meir Tiktiner of Prague composed a poem about Simhat Torah.

In Poland it was the custom to sell to the members of the congregation, on the 23rd of Tishri, the privilege of executing various functions during the services on Shabbat and Jewish festivals; i.e. the synagogue used this occasion as a fund-raiser. People who made these donations were called up to the Torah and given a congregational blessing.

Symbolism

"Feet" of the Torah
In Chabad Hasidic thought, the traditional dancing with the Torah allows the Jew to act as the "feet" of the Torah, taking the Torah where it wishes to go, as feet transport the head. This is thought as an act of submission to the will of God as expressed in the dictates of the Torah. It is an act that causes the Jew to inherently and naturally observe the Jewish faith. And just as the head benefits from the mobility of the feet, so does the Torah become exalted by the commitment of the Jew.

Symbol of Jewish identity
In the 20th century, Simhat Torah came to symbolize the public assertion of Jewish identity. The Jews of the Soviet Union, in particular, would celebrate the festival en masse in the streets of Moscow. On October 14, 1973, more than 100,000 Jews took part in a post–Simhat Torah rally in New York city on behalf of refuseniks and Soviet Jewry. Dancing in the street with the Torah has become part of the holiday's ritual in various Jewish congregations in the United States as well.

Rejoicing under adversity
Elie Wiesel related the difficulties and meaning of Simhat Torah in times of terrible adversity:The Gaon of Vilna said that ve-samachta be-chagekha (You shall rejoice in your festival; Deuteronomy 16:14) is the most difficult commandment in the Torah. I could never understand this puzzling remark. Only during the war did I understand. Those Jews who, in the course of their journey to the end of hope, managed to dance on Simhat Torah, those Jews who studied Talmud by heart while carrying stones on their back, those Jews who went on whispering Zemirot shel Shabbat (Hymns of Sabbath) while performing hard labor . . . ve-samachta be-chagekha was one commandment that was impossible to observe—yet they observed it.

Commemoration

In 1996, the Israel Postal Authority issued a postage stamp to honour the holiday.

See also
 Jewish holidays 2000–2050

References

Bibliography

 Goodman, Philip. Sukkot and Simchat Torah Anthology JPS, 1988. 
 Yaari, A. Toldot Hag Simchat Torah. Jerusalem: Mosad Harav Kook, 1964.
 Zinberg, Israel. Old Yiddish Literature from Its Origins to the Haskalah Period KTAV, 1975. . On Rebecca batMeir Tikitiner's Simchat Torah poem, see p. 51ff.

External links
 Chabad.org: Simchat Torah

Hallel
Hebrew names of Jewish holy days
Sukkot
Tishrei observances
Shemini Atzeret
Hebrew words and phrases in Jewish law
Torah